Lambda calculus is a formal mathematical system based on lambda abstraction and function application. Two definitions of the language are given here: a standard definition, and a definition using mathematical formulas.

Standard definition 
This formal definition was given by Alonzo Church.

Definition 
Lambda expressions are composed of
 the abstraction symbols lambda '' and dot '.'
 parentheses
The set of lambda expressions, can be defined inductively:
If  is a variable, then 
If , then 
Instances of rule 2 are known as abstractions and instances of rule 3 are known as applications.

Notation 
To keep the notation of lambda expressions uncluttered, the following conventions are usually applied.
 Outermost parentheses are dropped:  instead of 
 Applications are assumed to be left-associative:  may be written instead of 
 The body of an abstraction extends as far right as possible:  means  and not 
 A sequence of abstractions is contracted:  is abbreviated as

Free and bound variables 
The abstraction operator, is said to bind its variable wherever it occurs in the body of the abstraction. Variables that fall within the scope of an abstraction are said to be bound. All other variables are called free. Also note that a variable is bound by its "nearest" abstraction.

 , where  is a variable
 
 

An expression that contains no free variables is said to be closed. Closed lambda expressions are also known as combinators and are equivalent to terms in combinatory logic.

Reduction 
The meaning of lambda expressions is defined by how expressions can be reduced.

There are three kinds of reduction:
 α-conversion: changing bound variables (alpha);
 β-reduction: applying functions to their arguments (beta);
 η-reduction: which captures a notion of extensionality (eta).
We also speak of the resulting equivalences: two expressions are β-equivalent, if they can be β-converted into the same expression, and α/η-equivalence are defined similarly.

The term redex, short for reducible expression, refers to subterms that can be reduced by one of the reduction rules.

α-conversion 
Alpha-conversion, sometimes known as alpha-renaming, allows bound variable names to be changed. For example, alpha-conversion of  might yield . Terms that differ only by alpha-conversion are called α-equivalent. Frequently in uses of lambda calculus, α-equivalent terms are considered to be equivalent.

The precise rules for alpha-conversion are not completely trivial. First, when alpha-converting an abstraction, the only variable occurrences that are renamed are those that are bound to the same abstraction. The latter has a different meaning from the original.

Second, alpha-conversion is not possible if it would result in a variable getting captured by a different abstraction.

In programming languages with static scope, alpha-conversion can be used to make name resolution simpler by ensuring that no variable name masks a name in a containing scope (see alpha renaming to make name resolution trivial).

Substitution 
Substitution, written , is the process of replacing all free occurrences of the variable  in the expression  with expression .
Substitution on terms of the lambda calculus is defined by recursion on the structure of terms, as follows (note: x and y are only variables while M and N are any λ expression).
 

To substitute into a lambda abstraction, it is sometimes necessary to α-convert the expression. Notice that substitution is defined uniquely up to α-equivalence.

β-reduction 

η-reduction 

Normalization 

The purpose of β-reduction is to calculate a value. A value in lambda calculus is a function. So β-reduction continues until the expression looks like a function abstraction.

A lambda expression that cannot be reduced further, by either β-redex, or η-redex is in normal form. Note that alpha-conversion may convert functions. All normal forms that can be converted into each other by α-conversion are defined to be equal. See the main article on Beta normal form for details.

Syntax definition in BNF 
Lambda Calculus has a simple syntax. A lambda calculus program has the syntax of an expression where,

The variable list is defined as,
 <variable-list> := <variable> | <variable>, <variable-list>

A variable as used by computer scientists has the syntax,
 <variable> ::= <alpha> <extension>
 <extension> ::= 
 <extension> ::= <extension-char> <extension> 
 <extension-char> ::= <alpha> | <digit> | _
Mathematicians will sometimes restrict a variable to be a single alphabetic character. When using this convention the comma is omitted from the variable list.

A lambda abstraction has a lower precedence than an application, so;
 

Applications are left associative;
 

An abstraction with multiple parameters is equivalent to multiple abstractions of one parameter.
 
where,
 x is a variable
 y is a variable list
 z is an expression

Definition as mathematical formulas 
The problem of how variables may be renamed is difficult. This definition avoids the problem by substituting all names with canonical names, which are constructed based on the position of the definition of the name in the expression. The approach is analogous to what a compiler does, but has been adapted to work within the constraints of mathematics.

Semantics 
The execution of a lambda expression proceeds using the following reductions and transformations,

 α-conversion - 
 β-reduction - 
 η-reduction - 
where,
 canonym is a renaming of a lambda expression to give the expression standard names, based on the position of the name in the expression.
 Substitution Operator,  is the substitution of the name  by the lambda expression  in lambda expression .
 
Execution is performing β-reductions and η-reductions on subexpressions in the canonym of a lambda expression until the result is a lambda function (abstraction) in the normal form.

All α-conversions of a λ-expression are considered to be equivalent.

Canonym - Canonical Names 
Canonym is a function that takes a lambda expression and renames all names canonically, based on their positions in the expression. This might be implemented as,
 
 

Where, N is the string "N", F is the string "F", S is the string "S", + is concatenation, and "name" converts a string into a name

Map operators 
Map from one value to another if the value is in the map. O is the empty map.

Substitution operator 
If L is a lambda expression, x is a name, and y is a lambda expression;
 means substitute x by y in L. The rules are,
 
 
 
 

Note that rule 1 must be modified if it is to be used on non canonically renamed lambda expressions. See Changes to the substitution operator.

Free and bound variable sets 
The set of free variables of a lambda expression, M, is denoted as FV(M). This is the set of variable names that have instances not bound (used) in a lambda abstraction, within the lambda expression. They are the variable names that may be bound to formal parameter variables from outside the lambda expression.

The set of bound variables of a lambda expression, M, is denoted as BV(M). This is the set of variable names that have instances bound (used) in a lambda abstraction, within the lambda expression.

The rules for the two sets are given below.

Usage;
 The Free Variable Set, FV is used above in the definition of the η-reduction.
 The Bound Variable Set, BV, is used in the rule for β-redex of non canonical lambda expression.

Evaluation strategy 
This mathematical definition is structured so that it represents the result, and not the way it gets calculated. However the result may be different between lazy and eager evaluation. This difference is described in the evaluation formulas.

The definitions given here assume that the first definition that matches the lambda expression will be used. This convention is used to make the definition more readable. Otherwise some if conditions would be required to make the definition precise.

Running or evaluating a lambda expression L is,
 

where Q is a name prefix possibly an empty string and eval is defined by,
 

Then the evaluation strategy may be chosen as either,
 
The result may be different depending on the strategy used. Eager evaluation will apply all reductions possible, leaving the result in normal form, while lazy evaluation will omit some reductions in parameters, leaving the result in "weak head normal form".

Normal form 
All reductions that can be applied have been applied. This is the result obtained from applying eager evaluation.
 
In all other cases,

Weak head normal form 
Reductions to the function (the head) have been applied, but not all reductions to the parameter have been applied. This is the result obtained from applying lazy evaluation.
 
In all other cases,

Derivation of standard from the math definition 
The standard definition of lambda calculus uses some definitions which may be considered as theorems, which can be proved based on the definition as mathematical formulas.

The canonical naming definition deals with the problem of variable identity by constructing a unique name for each variable based on the position of the lambda abstraction for the variable name in the expression.

This definition introduces the rules used in the standard definition and relates explains them in terms of the canonical renaming definition.

Free and bound variables
The lambda abstraction operator, λ, takes a formal parameter variable and a body expression. When evaluated the formal parameter variable is identified with the value of the actual parameter.

Variables in a lambda expression may either be "bound" or "free". Bound variables are variable names that are already attached to formal parameter variables in the expression.

The formal parameter variable is said to bind the variable name wherever it occurs free in the body. Variable (names) that have already been matched to formal parameter variable are said to be bound. All other variables in the expression are called free.

For example, in the following expression y is a bound variable and x is free: . Also note that a variable is bound by its "nearest" lambda abstraction. In the following example the single occurrence of x in the expression is bound by the second lambda:

Changes to the substitution operator 
In the definition of the Substitution Operator the rule,
 
must be replaced with,

 
 

This is to stop bound variables with the same name being substituted. This would not have occurred in a canonically renamed lambda expression.

For example the previous rules would have wrongly translated,

The new rules block this substitution so that it remains as,

Transformation 
The meaning of lambda expressions is defined by how expressions can be transformed or reduced.

There are three kinds of transformation:
 α-conversion: changing bound variables (alpha);
 β-reduction: applying functions to their arguments (beta), calling functions;
 η-reduction: which captures a notion of extensionality (eta).
We also speak of the resulting equivalences: two expressions are β-equivalent, if they can be β-converted into the same expression, and α/η-equivalence are defined similarly.

The term redex, short for reducible expression, refers to subterms that can be reduced by one of the reduction rules.

α-conversion 
Alpha-conversion, sometimes known as alpha-renaming, allows bound variable names to be changed. For example, alpha-conversion of  might give . Terms that differ only by alpha-conversion are called α-equivalent.

In an α-conversion, names may be substituted for new names if the new name is not free in the body, as this would lead to the capture of free variables.

Note that the substitution will not recurse into the body of lambda expressions with formal parameter  because of the change to the substitution operator described above.

See example;

β-reduction (capture avoiding) 
β-reduction captures the idea of function application (also called a function call), and implements the substitution of the actual parameter expression for the formal parameter variable. β-reduction is defined in terms of substitution.

If no variable names are free in the actual parameter and bound in the body, β-reduction may be performed on the lambda abstraction without canonical renaming.

 

See example;

In this example, 
 In the β-redex,
 The free variables are, 
 The bound variables are, 
 The naive β-redex changed the meaning of the expression because x and y from the actual parameter became captured when the expressions were substituted in the inner abstractions. 
 The alpha renaming removed the problem by changing the names of x and y in the inner abstraction so that they are distinct from the names of x and y in the actual parameter.
 The free variables are, 
 The bound variables are, 
 The β-redex then proceeded with the intended meaning.

η-reduction 
η-reduction expresses the idea of extensionality, which in this context is that two functions are the same if and only if they give the same result for all arguments.

η-reduction may be used without change on lambda expressions that are not canonically renamed.

 

The problem with using an η-redex when f has free variables is shown in this example,

This improper use of η-reduction changes the meaning by leaving  in   unsubstituted.

References 

Lambda calculus